The vice president of Bolivia, officially known as the vice president of the Plurinational State of Bolivia, is the second highest political position in Bolivia. The vice president replaces the president in his definitive absence or others impediment and is the ex officio President of the Legislative Assembly.

Thirty nine men have served as vice president of Bolivia since the office came into existence on 19 November 1826. José Ramón de Loayza was the first vice president of the Republic of Bolivia. The 38th vice president, Álvaro García Linera, was the last vice president of the Republic of Bolivia and the first vice president of the Plurinational State of Bolivia. The second and current vice president of the Plurnational State is David Choquehuanca (since 8 November 2020). There are currently five living former vice presidents. The most recent former vice president to die was Julio Garrett Ayllón on 19 March 2018.

The vice president is the first person in the presidential line of succession and assumes the presidency if the president dies, resigns, or is impeached and removed from office. Four vice presidents have ascended to the presidency following the resignation of their predecessor (José Luis Tejada Sorzano, Mamerto Urriolagoitía, Jorge Qurioga, and Carlos Mesa). René Barrientos was the only vice president to assume the presidency by deposing his own predecessor, Víctor Paz Estenssoro. When Barrientos died suddenly on 27 April 1969, Luis Adolfo Siles Salinas became the only vice president to become president through their predecessor's death.

Seven former vice presidents (Aniceto Arce, Mariano Baptista, Severo Fernández, Eliodoro Villazón, Hernán Siles Zuazo, René Barrientos, and Jaime Paz Zamora) were elected president in their own right while two (José Miguel de Velasco and Mariano Enrique Calvo) became president by other means. José Miguel de Velasco was the only vice president who had already served as president (1828) prior to becoming vice president.

Vice presidents

Republic of Bolivia (1826–1836) 
The office of vice president was first established on 19 November 1826, during the presidency of Antonio José de Sucre, following the promulgation of the Political Constitution of 1826, the first in the country's history. However, Sucre himself would never elect a candidate to be presented to the National Congress, leaving the position vacant throughout his term. The first elected vice president was José Miguel de Velasco on 12 August 1828. However, he was prevented from exercising the position as he instead served as interim president in the absence of the elected president Andrés de Santa Cruz.

As Santa Cruz never appeared to take office, the Conventional Assembly convened on 18 December 1828 to elect new leaders. José Ramón de Loayza would be elected vice president to Pedro Blanco Soto. Loayza served as acting president in the absence of Soto until 26 December at which point Soto assumed the office of the presidency and Loayza would exercise the vice presidency for the first time.

{| class="wikitable" style="text-align:center;"
|-
! colspan="2" | Vice Presidency
! colspan="2" | Vice President
! colspan="2" | Party
! Designation    
! Government
! President

|- style="height:2em;"
| rowspan="3" colspan=8 bgcolor="ECECEC"  
| rowspan="1" |Antonio Joséde Sucre

|- style="height:2em;"
| rowspan="1" |José María Pérezde Urdininea

|- style="height:2em;"
| rowspan="1" |Jose Miguel deVelasco Franco

|- style="height:6em;"
! rowspan="2" |1
| rowspan="2" | –End of mandate
| rowspan="2" data-sort-value="de Loayza, José Ramón" |
| rowspan="2" | José Ramón de Loayza
| rowspan="2" style="background-color: " |
| rowspan="2" | Independent
| rowspan="2" | Elected by the Constituent Assembly 
| rowspan="2" | Provisional 
| rowspan="1" 

|- style="height:6em;"
| rowspan="1" |Pedro BlancoSoto

|-
| colspan="9" bgcolor="ECECEC" {{CNone |Office vacant 1 – 31 January 1829
|-

|- style="height:6em;"
! rowspan="2" |2
| rowspan="2" | –Dismissed
| rowspan="2" data-sort-value="de Velasco Franco, José Miguel" | 
| rowspan="2" | José Miguel deVelasco Franco
| rowspan="2" style="background-color: " |
| rowspan="2" | Independent
| rowspan="1" | Elected by the Constituent Assembly
| rowspan="1" | Provisional(31 January 1829)
| rowspan="1" 

|- style="height:6em;"
| rowspan="1" | Reelected by the Constituent Congress
| rowspan="1" | Constitutional  
(14 August 1831)
| rowspan="2" | Andrés deSanta Cruz

|- style="height:6em;"
! rowspan="1" | 3
| rowspan="1" | –Legal change
| rowspan="1" data-sort-value="Calvo, Mariano" |
| rowspan="1" |Mariano EnriqueCalvo
| rowspan="1" style="background-color: " |
| rowspan="1" | Independent
| rowspan="1" | Appointed by Andrés de Santa Cruz
| rowspan="1" |Constitutional

|}

 Bolivian State (1836–1839) 
The Bolivian State was one of the three states that made up the Peru-Bolivian Confederation. On 28 October 1836, Andrés de Santa Cruz was elected Supreme Protector of the Peru-Bolivian Confederation while simultaneously being the president of the Bolivian State. José Miguel de Velasco Franco remained Vice President of the Bolivian State until 23 July 1835 when he was replaced by Mariano Enrique Calvo. For much of his tenure, Calvo would serve as acting president in replacement of Santa Cruz when he was in Peruvian territory. 

 Republic of Bolivia (1880–2009) 

Upon the dissolution of the Peru-Bolivian Confederation, Jose Miguel de Velasco overthrew Marshal Andrés de Santa Cruz and assumed the presidency of the Bolivian State on 22 February 1839, bringing an end to it and reviving the Republic of Bolivia with his secessionist pronouncement. On 26 October 1839, de Velasco promulgated the Political Constitution of 1839 which eliminated the position of vice president making the President of the Senate the first in the presidential order of succession instead. This situation lasted until 15 February 1878, when the Political Constitution of 1878 was promulgated under Hilarión Daza. The Constitution of 1878 reincorporated the position of vice president, though it remained vacant for the remainder of Daza's presidency.

Following the overthrow of Daza, during the presidency of Narciso Campero, the unique feature of two vice presidents came to be. On 31 May 1880, the National Convention appointed Aniceto Arce and Belisario Salinas, respectively, as first and second vice presidents. The dual-vice presidency was formally established upon the promulgation of the Political Constitution of 1880 on 28 October. The Constitution of 1880 established two vice presidents who were elected like the president by direct vote, but with different powers: The first vice president presided over the Senate and was empowered to replace or succeed the president while the second vice president only had the function of replacing or succeeding the president  in case of absence, resignation, inability or death of the first vice president.

This dual form of vice presidents was in force until 24 January 1921 when the Congress-Convention of 1921, convened by Bautista Saavedra, abolished the position of second vice president. On 4 December 1939, interim president Carlos Quintanilla would amend the 1938 Constitution to abolish the office of the vice presidency in order to circumnavigate the claims to succession of former vice president Enrique Baldivieso. The position was revived on 24 November 1945 with the promulgation of the Political Constitution of 1945 during the presidency of Gualberto Villarroel.

 Plurinational State of Bolivia (2009–present) 
The emergence of the Plurinational State occurred as a consequence of the promulgation of the Political Constitution of 2009. Drafted by the Constituent Assembly in 2007, the new constitution was approved in a popular referendum on 25 January 2009, and was promulgated on 7 February. The Constitution resulted in a change in the official name of the country, leaving behind its previous denominative of Republic of Bolivia to become the Plurinational State of Bolivia. In order to comply with the structural changes of the new constitution, it was decided to advance the general elections to be held on 6 December 2009, with Evo Morales and Vice President Álvaro García Linera winning again, with 64.22%'' of the votes. This situation made Álvaro García Linera the last vice president of the Republic and the first of the Plurinational State.

Timeline

See also 
 President of Bolivia
 List of presidents of Bolivia
 List of current vice presidents

Notes

References

External links
 Vicepresidencia del Estado Plurinacional de Bolivia 

 
Government of Bolivia
Bolivia
Bolivia
1828 establishments in Bolivia